Paul Randolph (born June 22, 1966) is a former Canadian football linebacker in the Canadian Football League who played for the Winnipeg Blue Bombers, and Montreal Alouettes. He played college football for the UT Martin Skyhawks.

In January 2022, Randolph joined the Indiana Hoosiers as the defensive line coach.

References

1968 births
Living people
American football linebackers
Canadian football linebackers
Winnipeg Blue Bombers players
Montreal Alouettes players
UT Martin Skyhawks football players